Hinterland Aviation is a regional airline and charter company based at Cairns Airport in Queensland, Australia. The airline operates scheduled flights from Cairns Airport and Townsville Airport.

History
The airline was established in 1984 as a charter operation servicing the mining industry, Hinterland Aviation Pty Ltd was acquired by retail travel firm Trailfinders in 1992 and developed a firm footing in the tourism charter industry. The engineering division started in 1995 to support the local needs of the Far North aviation industry.
The business was sold in mid-2015 to Broome Air Services, whose Chief Executive Peter Christoudias described it as a merger, not a takeover.

Fleet
Hinterland has a fleet of 16 aircraft:

2 x Cessna 402
1 x Cessna 404
11 x Cessna Caravan
2 x Beechcraft King Air 200

Destinations
From its Cairns base, Hinterland Aviation operates scheduled airline services to Cooktown and Coen. From the airline's Townsville base they operate scheduled flights to Palm Island. The airline also operates numerous charter flights for private clients and Queensland government agencies, as well as international medical evacuation flights into and out of Papua New Guinea.

See also
List of airlines of Australia

References

External links

Airlines of Australia
Companies based in Queensland
Australian companies established in 1984
Airlines established in 1984
Charter airlines of Australia
Regional Aviation Association of Australia